Skute Church is a parish church of the Church of Norway in Søndre Land Municipality in Innlandet county, Norway. It is located in the village of Ringelia. It is the church for the Skute parish which is part of the Hadeland og Land prosti (deanery) in the Diocese of Hamar. The brown, wooden church was built in a long church design in 1915 using plans drawn up by the architect Ole Stein. The church seats about 360 people.

History
In the early 20th century, planning began for a church in Søndre Land on the west side of the Randsfjorden. Ole Stein was hired to design the new church. Peder Skute donated the land on which the church was built. It was built as a long church in a style that mimics the designs of the medieval stave churches in Norway. The new building was consecrated by Bishop Christen Brun on 16 June 1915. The church received electric lighting in 1923 and electric heating in 1955.

See also
List of churches in Hamar

References

Søndre Land
Churches in Innlandet
Long churches in Norway
Wooden churches in Norway
20th-century Church of Norway church buildings
Churches completed in 1915
1915 establishments in Norway